The Demise of the Crown Act 1702 (1 Anne c 2) is an Act of the Parliament of England. It is partly still in force. It abolished the rule that all legal proceedings automatically came to an end on the death of the monarch.

See also
 Demise of the Crown Act 1727
 Demise of the Crown Act 1901

References
Halsbury's Statutes,

External links
The Demise of the Crown Act 1702, as amended, from Legislation.gov.uk.

Acts of the Parliament of England
1702 in law
1702 in England